Word of Mouth is the debut studio album by Toni Basil. It was first released in May 1981 in the United Kingdom and April 1982 in the United States. The album featured the number-one worldwide hit "Mickey". The album also contains three covers of songs by Devo who also performed on three tracks ("Be Stiff", "Space Girls", and "You Gotta Problem", a re-titled version of Devo's song "Pity You"). The US version of the album added the songs "Rock On" and "Shoppin' from A to Z", deleting "Hanging Around". The album was certified Gold by the RIAA.

Chart performance
The lead single "Mickey" became an international hit, earning a double platinum certification. The album, which was released shortly after, was also a success, peaking at number 22 and receiving a Gold certification. However, the following singles, "Nobody" in the UK and "Shoppin' from A to Z" in the US, both under-performed, which cut the album's success short. It also reached number 27 on the New Zealand albums chart.

Track listing

US LP
"Mickey" (Mike Chapman, Nicky Chinn) – 4:12
"Rock On" (David Essex) – 4:04
"Shoppin' from A to Z" (Allee Willis, Bruce Roberts, Toni Basil) – 4:08
"You Gotta Problem" (Mark Mothersbaugh) – 4:34
"Be Stiff" (Gerald Casale, Bob Lewis) – 3:22
"Nobody" (Paul Delph) – 4:00
"Little Red Book" (Burt Bacharach, Hal David) – 4:04
"Space Girls" (Casale) – 2:56
"Thief on the Loose" (Basil, Greg Mathieson) – 3:50
"Time After Time" (Nick Gilder, James McCullough) – 4:18

UK LP
"Nobody" – 4:03
"Hangin' Around" (Conway) – 4:08
"Thief on the Loose" – 3:54
"Time After Time" – 4:23
"Mickey" – 4:15
"Little Red Book" – 4:07
"Be Stiff" – 3:24
"Space Girls" – 3:00
"You Gotta Problem" – 4:36

International cassette
"Mickey"
"Nobody"
"Hangin' Around"
"Thief on the Loose"
"Little Red Book"
"Time After Time"
"Be Stiff"
"Space Girls"
"You Gotta Problem"

Personnel
Toni Basil – vocals
Rick Parnell, Alan Myers, Ed Greene, Mike Baird – drums
Doug Lunn, Gerald Casale (credited as Jerry Casale) – bass
Mike Chapman – synthesizer and keyboards on "Mickey"
Dorsey High Cheerleaders, classes of 1980–81 – stomping and chanting on "Mickey"
Greg Mathieson, Michael Boddicker, Mark Mothersbaugh, Paul Delph – synthesizer
Bob Mothersbaugh, John Goodsall, Bob Casale, Richie Zito, Trevor Veitch, David Storrs – guitar
Richard Greene – violin on "Rock On"
Dan Wyman – synthesizer programming; vocoder on "Space Girls"
Allee Willis, Bruce Roberts, Bob Esty – additional vocals
The Alphabet Singers – additional backing vocals on "Shoppin' from A to Z"
Technical
Produced by Greg Mathieson and Trevor Veitch
John Michael Weaver, Joe Robb, Tony D'Amico, David Leonard – engineer
Janet Levinson – design
Steven Arnold – cover photography

Charts

Weekly charts

Year-end charts

References

1981 debut albums
Chrysalis Records albums
Toni Basil albums
Albums produced by Trevor Veitch